Gabriela Dabrowski and Xu Yifan were the defending champions, but lost in the first round to Simona Halep and Raluca Olaru.

Chan Hao-ching and Latisha Chan won the title, defeating Kirsten Flipkens and Bethanie Mattek-Sands in the final, 2–6, 6–3, [10–6].

Seeds

Draw

Draw

References

External Links 
Main Draw

Eastbourne Internationalandnbsp;- Doubles
2019 Women's Doubles